The Middle Circle was a Great Western Railway service in London that operated from 1872 to 1905. The route was from the District Railway station at Mansion House to Earl's Court, then via the West London Railway to Latimer Road on to the Hammersmith & City Railway and then via the Metropolitan Railway to the City of London. Although not a complete circuit, it was one of several 'circle' routes around London that opened at the same time, such as the 'inner circle' that is today's Circle line. Trains would run once every 30 minutes. In 1900 the service was cut back to run from Earl's Court to Aldgate, and ended in 1905.

History

Origins
The Great Western Railway (GWR) opened the Hammersmith & City Railway (H&CR) on 13 June 1864, and from 1 July 1864 carriages from Kensington (Addison Road) (now Kensington [Olympia]) were attached and detached from trains at Notting Hill; through services between Kensington and the City of London beginning in April 1865. A station had been built on the chord linking the H&CR and West London Railway, but this never opened due to GWR objections.  Following an agreement between the Metropolitan Railway and GWR in August 1868, Uxbridge Road station, designed by the London & North Western Railway (L&NWR), opened on the West London Railway on 1 November 1869.

Middle Circle
The Middle Circle service started on 1 August 1872 when the GWR extended this service from Addison Road over the District Railway to Earl's Court and onto Mansion House. The GWR provided most of the locomotives and carriages for the service. When the Metropolitan extended the north side of its railway eastward from Moorgate, the Middle Circle followed suit and Bishopsgate (now Liverpool Street) became the terminus on 12 July 1875 and then Aldgate took the role from 4 December 1876. Trains ran once every 30 minutes.

From 1 July 1900, the service was cut back to run from Earl's Court to Aldgate, and the Middle Circle service ended on 31 January 1905.

Metropolitan Railway
From 1 February 1905 the service was temporarily replaced by a shuttle from Addison Road to Hammersmith & City stations, until 5 November 1906, when  four electric trains an hour began running from Addison Road to Aldgate, one continuing to Whitechapel. This service appears on the 1908 'London Underground' map as a Metropolitan Railway service.

Passenger services on the West London Railway were ended on 19 October 1940 following bomb damage to the line, and the link between Latimer Road and the WLR closed. The curve was demolished in the 1960s to make way for the construction of the West Cross Route motorway.

With the exception of the Uxbridge Road, today the stations are served by the Circle, District and Hammersmith & City lines. Uxbridge Road station closed with the line in 1940 and  opened on the same site in 2008.

List of stations
The following stations were served by the Middle Circle:

Notes and references

Notes

References

Sources

External links
Clive's Underground Line Guides - Circle Line

Closed London Underground lines
Transport in the London Borough of Camden
Transport in the London Borough of Hackney
Transport in the London Borough of Hammersmith and Fulham
Transport in the London Borough of Islington
Transport in the Royal Borough of Kensington and Chelsea
Transport in the City of Westminster
Transport in the City of London
Transport in the London Borough of Tower Hamlets
Great Western Railway